Hits 3 may refer to:

 Hits 3 (compilation album), a 1985 compilation album released in the UK 
 Hits 3 (Spice 1 album), 2002